The Triangle J Council of Governments is one of the 17 regional North Carolina Councils of Governments (Region J) established by the North Carolina General Assembly for the purpose of regional planning and administration. Headquartered in Durham, North Carolina, it serves Moore, Lee, Chatham, Orange, Durham, Wake, and Johnston counties.

History
The TJCOG was originally established in 1959 by the Research Triangle Foundation as the Research Triangle Regional Planning Commission. The commission's original members were Durham, Orange and Wake counties, and the cities of Chapel Hill, Durham, and Raleigh.

When the North Carolina General Assembly established 18 regional planning councils in 1972, the Research Triangle Regional Planning Commission was reorganized as the planning council for Region J, which consisted of Durham, Orange, Wake, Chatham, Johnston and Lee counties. Moore County was added when the planning commission for Region H was abolished.

Membership
The following county and municipal governments are members of the Triangle J Council of Governments:
Chatham County
Goldston
Pittsboro
Durham County
Durham
Johnston County
Benson
Kenly
Princeton
Smithfield
Lee County
Broadway
Sanford
Moore County
Cameron
Foxfire Village
Orange County
Carrboro
Chapel Hill
Hillsborough
Wake County
Apex (Delegate: Apex Councilman Bill Jensen)
Cary
Fuquay-Varina
Garner (Delegate: Garner Mayor Ronnie Williams)
Holly Springs
Knightdale
Morrisville
Raleigh
Rolesville
Wake Forest
Wendell
Zebulon

External links
 Official Website
 Guide to the Research Triangle Region General Development Plan, 1980

North Carolina Councils of Governments
Research Triangle